Dendropsophus ozzyi is a frog in the family Hylidae.  It is endemic to in Brazil.

Initial description

References

Amphibians described in 2014
Frogs of South America
ozzyi